Sylvan or Sylvans (from the Latin silva: "forest, woods") may refer to:

Places

United States
 Sylvan, Illinois, a former settlement
 Sylvan, Wisconsin, a town
 Sylvan (community), Wisconsin, an unincorporated area in the town
 Sylvan Township (disambiguation)
 Sylvan Lake (South Dakota)
 Sylvan Pass (Wyoming), a mountain pass in Yellowstone National Park
 Sylvan-Highlands, Portland, Oregon, a neighborhood of Portland, Oregon
 West Haven-Sylvan, Oregon, a neighboring unincorporated area
 Sylvan Beach, New York
 Penn's Sylvania (Penn's Woods), the Province of Pennsylvania which was the kernel of the later state

Canada
 Sylvan Lake (Alberta)
 Sylvan, a community in the municipality of North Middlesex, Ontario

Arts and entertainment
 Sylvan (band), a German progressive rock band
 Sylvan Whittingham/Mason (songwriter) Singer, Songwriter, Photographer
 Sylvan Esso, an American indie pop band
 Sylvan (TV series), a Spanish animated series created by Antoni D'ocon
 Sylvan Campaign, a faction in the video game Heroes of Might and Magic V

Names
 Sylvan (name), a list of people with either the given name or surname
 Sylvan Debating Club, a free speech society in London
 Sylvan, a Latin adjective meaning of or from the woodland
 Sylvan Learning, a remedial and enrichment tutoring company
 Sylvans S.C., a football club based on the Channel Island of Guernsey
 another name for 2-methyl furan, a flammable liquid

See also
 519 Sylvania, asteroid
 Silvan (disambiguation)
 Silvania (disambiguation)
 Silvanus (disambiguation)
 Silvanus (mythology), Roman deity from whom the adjective sylvan derives
 Sylvain (disambiguation)
 Sylvania (disambiguation)